Alstroemeria psittacina, with the common names Peruvian lily, parrot flower, parrot lily, lily of the Incas, princess lily and New Zealand Christmas bell. It is found in cerrado and pantanal vegetation in Brazil and Argentina.

Description
Alstroemeria psittacina is a perennial herb with underground tubers. Flowers grow in umbels of 3-8 flowers. They can be red to reddish-purple, sometimes with brownish spots.

Distribution
It is native to Brazil, Argentina, and Paraguay but widely cultivated as an ornamental and escaped into the wild in Australia (New South Wales and Norfolk Island), New Zealand, Madeira, the Canary Islands, and the  southeastern United States (eastern Texas, Louisiana, Mississippi, Alabama, Georgia, and Florida).

Cultivation
Alstroemeria psittacina is cultivated as an ornamental plant by plant nurseries, for use in temperate gardens, such as in California.

It is a popular ornamental plant in New Zealand, where it usually blooms at Christmas because that it is also called New Zealand Christmas bell. In addition, this plant is cited as an invasive plant, and it is a natural host range of the  Alstroemeria mosaic potyvirus.

See also

 List of plants known as lily

Notes

References

External links

FloraBase, the Western Australian Flora: Alstroemeria psittacina 
Plant Viruses Online:  Alstroemeria mosaic potyvirus
USDA Plants Profile: Alstroemeria psittacina
Assis, M.C.de (2001). Alstroemeria L. (Alstroemeriaceae) do Brasil: 1–165. Tese de Doutorado, Instituto de Biociências da Universidade de São Paulo.
Camargo de Assis, M. (2012). Alstroemeriaceae na região sul do Brasil. Rodriguésia; Revista do Instituto de Biologia Vegetal, Jardim Botânico e Estaçao Biologica do Itatiaya 63: 1117–1132.

psittacina
Flora of Argentina
Flora of Brazil
Flora of the Cerrado
Christmas plants
Garden plants of South America

fr:Alstroemeria pulchella
pt:Alstroemeria pulchella
ro:Alstroemeria pulchella
sv:Alstroemeria pulchella